Swordfishtrombones is the eighth studio album by singer and songwriter Tom Waits, released in 1983 on Island Records. It was the first album that Waits produced himself. Stylistically different from his previous albums, Swordfishtrombones moves away from conventional piano-based songwriting towards unusual instrumentation and a somewhat more abstract and experimental rock approach.

The album peaked at No. 164 on the Billboard Pop Albums and 200 albums charts.

Artwork
The cover art is a TinTone photograph by Michael A. Russ showing Waits with the actors Angelo Rossitto and Lee Kolima.

Critical reception

At the end of 1983, Swordfishtrombones was ranked the second best album of the year by NME.

In 1989, Spin named Swordfishtrombones the second greatest album of all time. In 2000, it was voted number 374 in Colin Larkin's All Time Top 1000 Albums.

Pitchfork ranked Swordfishtrombones at number 11 in its 2002 list of the best albums of the 1980s. In 2006, Q listed Swordfishtrombones as the 36th best album of the 1980s, while in 2012, Slant Magazine listed it as the decade's 26th best album.

Track listing
All tracks written by Tom Waits. Arranger Frances Thumm. Recorded by Tim Boyle and Biff Dawes. Mixed by Dawes at Sunset Sound Studios, Hollywood, CA.

Side one
"Underground" – 1:58
"Shore Leave" – 4:12
"Dave the Butcher" (instrumental) – 2:15
"Johnsburg, Illinois" – 1:30
"16 Shells From a Thirty-Ought-Six" – 4:30
"Town with No Cheer" – 4:22
"In the Neighborhood" – 3:04

Side two

"Just Another Sucker on the Vine" (instrumental) – 1:42
"Frank's Wild Years" – 1:50
"Swordfishtrombone" – 3:00
"Down, Down, Down" – 2:10
"Soldier's Things" – 3:15
"Gin Soaked Boy" – 2:20
"Trouble's Braids" – 1:18
"Rainbirds" (instrumental) – 3:05

Personnel
Tom Waits – vocals (1:1–2, 1:4–7, 2:2–7), chair (1:2), Hammond B-3 organ (1:3), piano (1:4, 2:5, 2:8), harmonium (1:6, 2:1), synthesizer (1:6), freedom bell (1:6)
Victor Feldman – bass marimba (1:1–2), marimba (1:2, 2:3), shaker (1:2), bass drum with rice (1:2), bass boo bams (1:3), Brake drum (1:5), bell plate (1:5), snare (1:5, 2:4), Hammond B-3 organ (1:7), snare drum (1:7), bells (1:7), conga (2:3), bass drum (2:3), Dabuki drum (2:3), tambourine (2:4), African talking drum (2:7)
Larry Taylor – acoustic bass (1:1–2, 1:5, 1:7, 2:2, 2:4, 2:6–7), electric bass (2:3)
Randy Aldcroft – baritone horn (1:1, 1:7), trombone (1:2)
Stephen Taylor Arvizu Hodges – drums (1:1–2, 1:5, 2:4, 2:6), parade drum (1:7), cymbals (1:7), parade bass drum (2:7), glass harmonica (2:8)
Fred Tackett – electric guitar (1:1, 1:2, 1:5, 2:6), banjo (1:2)
Francis Thumm – metal aunglongs (1:2), glass harmonica (2:8)
Greg Cohen – bass (1:4), acoustic bass (2:3, 2:5, 2:8)
Joe Romano – trombone (1:5), trumpet (2:1)
Anthony Clark Stewart – bagpipes (1:6)
Clark Spangler – synthesizer program (1:6)
Bill Reichenbach Jr. – trombone (1:7)
Dick Hyde – trombone (1:7)
Ronnie Barron – Hammond organ (2:2)
Eric Bikales – organ (2:4)
Carlos Guitarlos – electric guitar (2:4)
Richard Gibbs – glass harmonica (2:8)

Charts

Usage in media
The Song "Underground" was used for the Chop Shop theme in the movie Robots.

Mike, Tom, and Crow sing "Underground" Upon Wanda's arrival in Atlantis in the Mystery Science Theater 3000 episode Alien from L.A..

References

Tom Waits albums
1983 albums
Island Records albums